Demon Master is the second full-length album by American heavy metal band Blind Illusion. The band changed to a softer hard rock/heavy metal sound with this release. It came 22 years after their first album, The Sane Asylum.

Track listing

Personnel 

Marc Biedermann – vocals, guitar
Danny Harcourt – guitar
Robert Nystrom – drums
Jon Brunner – producer, engineer

References

External links 

 Blind Illusion Official Site

Blind Illusion albums
2010 albums